Fulchincholi is a village in Solapur District of Maharashtra, India. Pandharpur is the block for Fulchincholi village. The total geographical area of village is 1467.75 hectares. Fulchincholi has a total population of 5,648 people (according to Census 2011 information). There are about 1,188 houses in Fulchincholi village.

About 
 Village            - Fulchincholi
 Block              - Pandharpur
 District           - Solapur
 State              - Maharashtra
 Country            - India
 Continent          - Asia
 Time Zone          - IST (UTC + 05:30)
 PIN Code           - 413304
 Currency           - Indian rupee (INR)
 Dialing Code       - +91
 Date format        - dd/mm/yyyy
 Driving side       - left
 Internet country code top-level domain (cTLD)      - .in
 Language           - Marathi
 Time difference    - 27 minutes
 Latitude           - 17.6930912
 Longitude          - 75.5005574
 Area               - 1467.75 hectares

Language 

The native language of Fulchincholi is Marathi and all of the village people speak it

Politics 
NCP, INC, and BJP are the major political parties in this area.

Connectivity

Transport

Railway 

The nearest railway station to Fulchincholi is Pandharpur which is 19.4 km away.  Other railway stations include:
Pandharpur railway station 19.4 km
Ashti railway station 19.8 km
Mohol railway station 22.4 km
Bohali railway station 26.6 km
Modnimb railway station 26.8 km

Airport 

Fulchincholi's nearest airport is Boramani International Airport, 43.2 km away. Other nearby airports include:
Boramani International Airport 43.2 km
Solapur Airport 46.4 km
Osmanabad Airport 87.5 km

Geography

Nearest districts 
Fulchincholi is 41.3 km from its district headquarters, Solapur. The other nearest district headquarters is Satara, 35.5 km away. Surrounding districts from Fulchincholi are as follows:
Osmanabad district 77.1 km
Bijapur district 98.5 km
Gulbarga district 123.6 km
Beed district 138.3 km

Nearby towns and cities 
Fulchincholi's nearest city is Pandharpur, 20.4 km away. Surrounding towns include:
Pandharpur 20.4 km
Mangalvedhe 21.3 km
Narkhed 29.4 km
Sangole 42.5 km
Solapur 49.1 km

Schools 
There are 7 to 8 schools in Fulchincholi, which provide schooling from junior KG to 10th class.

References

External links
 Location of Fulchincholi village on Google Maps

Villages in Solapur district